Karen Tanaka (born April 7, 1961) is a Japanese composer.

Biography 
Karen Tanaka was born in Tokyo where she started piano and composition lessons as a child. After studying composition with Akira Miyoshi and piano with Nobuko Amada at Toho Gakuen School of Music in Tokyo, she moved to Paris in 1986 with the aid of a French Government Scholarship to study with Tristan Murail and work at IRCAM as an intern. In 1987, she was awarded the Gaudeamus International Composers Award at the International Music Week in Amsterdam. She studied with Luciano Berio in Florence in 1990–91 with funds from the Nadia Boulanger Foundation and a Japanese Government Scholarship. In 1996, she received the Margaret Lee Crofts Fellowship at the Tanglewood Music Center. In 1998, she was appointed as Co-Artistic Director of the Yatsugatake Kogen Music Festival, previously directed by Toru Takemitsu. In 2005, she was awarded the Bekku Prize.

In 2012, Tanaka was selected as a fellow of the Sundance Institute’s Composers Lab for Feature Film where she was mentored by Hollywood's leading composers. In 2016, she served as an orchestrator for the BBC's TV series, Planet Earth II. She has scored numerous short films, animations, and documentaries. Sister, one of the animated films she scored, was selected for prestigious film festivals including Sundance, Annecy, Ottawa, and nominated for the 92nd Academy Awards for Best Animated Short Film in January 2020.

Her works have been performed by distinguished ensembles and orchestras worldwide, including the BBC Symphony Orchestra, Los Angeles Philharmonic, Baltimore Symphony Orchestra, Berkeley Symphony Orchestra, Netherlands Radio Symphony Orchestra, Norwegian Chamber Orchestra, NHK Symphony Orchestra in Tokyo, Orchestre Philharmonique de Radio France, Brodsky Quartet, BIT20 Ensemble, Gothic Voices, Anúna, among many others. Various dance companies, including the Nederlands Dans Theater, have also featured her music.

Tanaka has received numerous commissions from, most notably, the Royal Academy of Music, the Juilliard School, Radio France, the Canada Council for the Arts for Eve Egoyan, the Arts Council of England for Brodsky Quartet, the BBC Symphony Orchestra conducted by Kazushi Ono, the Michael Vyner Trust for the NHK Symphony Orchestra conducted by Esa-Pekka Salonen, Jane Dutcher for Joan Jeanrenaud and the Berkeley Symphony Orchestra conducted by Kent Nagano, and the National Endowment for the Arts for the Rochester Philharmonic Orchestra conducted by Peter Bay.

Her love of nature and concern for the environment has influenced many of her works, including Questions of Nature, Frozen Horizon, Water and Stone, Dreamscape, Ocean, Silent Ocean, Tales of Trees, Water Dance, Crystalline series, and Children of Light.

Tanaka taught composition at the University of California, Santa Barbara, and the University of Michigan, Ann Arbor. Her music is published by Chester Music in London (Wise Music Group), Schott Music New York (PSNY), ABRSM in the UK and Editions Bim in Switzerland. She lives in Los Angeles and teaches composition at California Institute of the Arts.

Major works

Orchestral 
Anamorphose (1986), for piano and orchestra
Departure (1999–2000)
Echo Canyon (1995)
Guardian Angel (2000), for clarinet, harp, percussion and string orchestra
Hommage en cristal (1991), for piano and string orchestra
Initium (1992–93), for orchestra and electronics
Lost Sanctuary (2002)
Prismes (1984)
Rose Absolute (2002)
Urban Prayer (2003–04), for cello and orchestra
Water of Life (2012–13)
Wave Mechanics (1994)

Chamber 
Always in my heart (1999), for clarinet and piano
At the grave of Beethoven (1999), for string quartet
Dreamscape (2001), for 7 instruments
Enchanted Forest (2013), for horn and piano
Frozen Horizon (1998), for 7 instruments
Holland Park Avenue Study (2002), for 5 instruments
Invisible Curve (1996), for 5 instruments
Metal Strings (1996), for string quartet
Ocean (2003), for violin and piano
Once Upon a Time (2021), for flute and piano
Polarization (1994), for 2 percussionists
Shibuya Tokyo (2009), for 2 violins
Silent Ocean (2005), for trumpet and piano
Water and Stone (1999), for 8 instruments
Wind Whisperer (2019), for flute, viola and harp

Piano/Harpsichord 
Blue Crystal (2014), for piano
Children of Light (1998–99), for piano
Crystalline (1988), for piano
Crystalline II (1995–96), for piano
Crystalline III (2000), for piano
Herb Garden (2005), for piano four hands
Jardin des herbes (1989, rev. 1995), for harpsichord
Lavender (1989), for harpsichord
Lavender Field (2000), for piano
Love in the Wind (2017), for piano
Masquerade (2013), for piano
Northern Light (2002), for piano
Our Planet Earth (2010–11), for piano
Techno Etudes (2000), for piano
Techno Etudes II (2020), for piano
Water Dance (2008), for piano
Who Stole the Tarts? (2016), for piano
The Zoo in the Sky (1994–95), for piano

Solo instrumental 
Aube (2020), for cello, narration and electronics
L'Éternité (2021), for violin and electronics
Lilas (1988), for cello
Metallic Crystal (1994–95), for metallic percussion and electronics
Night Bird (1996), for alto saxophone and electronics
The Song of Songs (1996), for cello and electronics
Tales of Trees (2003), for marimba
Wave Mechanics II (1994), for violin and electronics

Electroacoustic 
 Celestial Harmonics (1997)
Inuit Voices (1997)
Questions of Nature (1998)

Choral 
God is Love as Love is God (2009)
God Loves Us All (2009)
Rise Up Hallelu (2009)
Sleep Deeply (2018)
Sleep My Child (2012)
Wait for the Lord (2009)

Sound design 
Opening Bell for Daiichi Seimei Hall (2000)
Viva Suntory! for Suntory Hall (2010)

Discography 
At the grave of Beethoven (Vanguard Classics – 992120), Brodsky Quartet
Children of Light (BMG – BVCC 37200), Ikuyo Nakamichi, piano
Crystalline (EVE0104), Eve Egoyan, piano
Crystalline (2L – 074 SACD), Signe Bakke, piano
Crystalline II (CRI – CD855), Xak Bjerken, piano
Crystalline II (2L – 074 SACD), Signe Bakke, piano
Frozen Horizon (New World Records – 80683), Azure Ensemble
Initium (Camerata – 32CM319), Tokyo Symphony Orchestra; Kazuyoshi Akiyama, conductor
Invisible Curve (New World Records – 80683), Azure Ensemble
Jardin des herbes (Albany Records – TROY1049), Calvert Johnson, harpsichord
Lavender Field (MET – CD 1053), Thalia Myers, piano
Love in the Wind (Octavia Records – TRITON OVCT-00175), Yuko Nakamichi, piano
Metallic Crystal (Mode Records 189-192), Roland Auzet, percussion
Night Bird (BIS – CD890), Claude Delangle, alto saxophone
Night Bird (First Hand Records – FHR13), Gerard McChrystal, alto saxophone
Night Bird (La Cupula Music), David Hernando Vitores, alto saxophone
Northern Light (USK – 1227 CDD), Thalia Myers, piano
Our Planet Earth (Sony – SICC 1575), Ikuyo Nakamichi, piano
Prismes (BIS – CD490), Malmö Symphony Orchestra; Junichi Hirokami, conductor
Shibuya Tokyo (Composers Concordance – COMCON0042), Mioi Takeda and Lynn Bechtold, violins
Silent Ocean (CRYSTON OVCC-00040), Osamu Kumashiro, trumpet; Kazumasa Watanabe, piano
The Song of Songs (New Albion Records – NA 120), Joan Jeanrenaud, cello
The Song of Songs (Albany Records – TROY726), Medeleine Shapiro, cello
The Song of Songs (trptk – TTK0011), Maya Fridman, cello
Techno Etudes (BVHAAST – 1000), Tomoko Mukaiyama, piano
Techno Etudes (2L – 074 SACD), Signe Bakke, piano
Water and Stone (New World Records – 80683), Azure Ensemble
Water Dance (2L – 074 SACD), Signe Bakke, piano
Water Dance (Nami Records – WWCC 7708), Kayako Matsunaga, piano
Wave Mechanics (Deutsche Grammophon – POCG 1860), Ensemble Kanazawa
Wave Mechanics II (Albany Records – TROY1305), Airi Yoshioka, violin
The Zoo in the Sky (BMG – BVCC 1094), Ikuyo Nakamichi, piano

References

External links 
 Karen Tanaka@Wise Music Classical
 Karen Tanaka@PSNY
 Karen Tanaka@Editions Bim
 Karen Tanaka@IMDb

1961 births
20th-century classical composers
20th-century American composers
20th-century American women musicians
20th-century Japanese composers
20th-century Japanese educators
20th-century women composers
20th-century women educators
21st-century American composers
21st-century American women musicians
21st-century classical composers
21st-century Japanese composers
21st-century Japanese educators
21st-century women composers
21st-century women educators
American classical composers
American women classical composers
American music educators
American women music educators
Japanese classical composers
Japanese expatriates in the United States
Japanese women classical composers
Japanese music educators
Living people
University of Michigan faculty
American women academics
21st-century Japanese women musicians